The Hyundai Grandeur is an executive sedan manufactured and marketed by the South Korean manufacturer Hyundai since 1986. From 1986 to 1996, the Grandeur was the flagship for Hyundai's South Korean range before the Hyundai Dynasty was introduced. The Grandeur has evolved through five generations with intermediate restylings, and is marketed under various nameplates worldwide—prominently as the Hyundai Azera. As the Azera, it was the flagship of Hyundai's US and Canadian lineup until the arrival of the Genesis sedan. After the launch of the separate Genesis brand, the Grandeur/Azera resumed its place as the company's flagship.

As of the 2017 model year, the Azera is no longer marketed in the United States and Canada. The sedan continued to be available in South Korea and the Middle East.



First generation (L; 1986) 

The first Grandeur was a rebadged Mitsubishi Debonair produced by Hyundai. Initially launched with Mitsubishi-sourced 2.0L SOHC MPI version of the engine used in the first generation Sonata, a 2.4 L SOHC MPI engine was added in 1987. A V6 3.0 L engined model was launched in 1991 to better compete with the Daewoo Imperial.

Background 

Before the 1988 Seoul Olympics, most of the luxury car market of South Korea was held by Daewoo Motors and its Royale Series. From October 1978, Hyundai's top offering in South Korea was a locally built Ford Granada Mark II. The Daewoo Royale, however, was dominating the Granada in the market place, and Hyundai tried to enter the luxury car market with its own design. In the face of tough competition from Daewoo Motors' powerful brand, Hyundai abandoned this attempt and instead borrowed the platform, technology, and internal configuration from Mitsubishi Motors to create the first Hyundai Grandeur.

In the early eighties, Mitsubishi Motors also wanted to renew its aging Debonair model, which had not been substantially updated since its market launch in 1964. Given the existing relationship of sharing technologies and innovations, Mitsubishi accepted Hyundai's request to share a platform, internal configuration, and most importantly, an engine. As Hyundai was an official sponsor of 1988 Seoul Olympics, it used this opportunity to notify all the executives and important people about their new car, the Grandeur. Because of its Mitsubishi basis and good quality, it became very popular in Korea.

Also called "Gak (angular)-Grandeur", it succeeded the Hyundai-built Granada. Official Olympic sponsor Hyundai Motor co-developed the Grandeur with Mitsubishi Motors of Japan, and launched it in July 1986, well in advance of the 1988 Summer Olympics. The design was done by Hyundai Motors, but the internal configuration was done by Mitsubishi. It was the second FF layout model in Korea after Hyundai Excel. Originally, only a four-cylinder 2,000 cc engine and manual transmission were offered, but later a 2,400 cc engine, a 3,000 cc V6 engine, and automatic transmission became available. The Grandeur became Korea's best-selling large car by a considerable margin. It was also sold in Japan as the Mitsubishi Debonair V, but the demanding class was already absorbed by the Toyota Crown, Nissan Cedric/Gloria, Mazda Luce, and Honda Legend, and the Debonair was not competitive in its home market.

The Grandeur's taillight design was changed in 1989, and ABS first became available in 1991. It had 4-speed automatic transmission or 5-speed manual transmission. It was discontinued in September 1992, after 122,074 had been built.

Grandeur EV
Hyundai restomodded an example of the first generation Grandeur as an EV concept version called 'Hyundai Grandeur Heritage', using the "Parametric Pixel" design language from the Ioniq line. It celebrates the 35th anniversary of the Grandeur, and debuted at Hyundai Motorstudio Goyang on November 12, 2021. It is the second Heritage Series restomod EV after the Pony EV, and will be followed by the Galloper EV.

Second generation (LX; 1992) 

The New Grandeur and the third generation of the Mitsubishi Debonair were the products of a joint development between Hyundai and Mitsubishi Motors. Mitsubishi was responsible for the powertrain, and Hyundai was responsible for the body and trim design. Production of the car began in September 1992 and ended in 1998.

The "New Grandeur" came in various trim levels and only V6 engine combinations (2.0L, 2.5L, 3.0L, and 3.5L). The new Grandeur became a huge success following the first generation Grandeur it replaced. However, the reception of the same model marketed by Mitsubishi in Japan was perfunctory eventually leading Mitsubishi to discontinue it earlier than expected.

The 3-liter and 3.5-liter engines developed by Mitsubishi were substantial legacies to Hyundai, which at the time did not have the ability to manufacture engines of that size on its own. Following the Debonair's discontinuation in Japan, the Hyundai-Mitsubishi partnership led to the production of the Hyundai Equus and Mitsubishi Dignity premium flagship sedans, and the slightly smaller Hyundai Dynasty and Mitsubishi Proudia. Since the production of Hyundai Equus, Hyundai develops all engines in its product line on its own, such as the industry-acclaimed 4.6-liter Tau Engine featured on the Hyundai Genesis.

Although it was not exported outside the home market, the second generation Grandeur was a success in the Korean domestic market as the flagship sedan of Hyundai lineup. This model became a status symbol in Korea, which many politicians and wealthy business executives have used.

Third generation (XG; 1998) 

The third-generation Grandeur is marketed as the Grandeur XG, mirroring its internal development code. In North America and Japan, it was marketed as the Hyundai XG. The first two generations were essentially rebadged Mitsubishi Debonairs, with the third generation developed entirely by Hyundai, with technical experience learned from the first two generations. The Kia Opirus (Amanti in North America) shared a modified variant of the Grandeur/XG platform. After this generation, Hyundai developed the next generation on their own from the ground up with technology accumulated through past generations, enabling export of the XG outside South Korea without legal complications.

Leveraging its luxurious image, the XG moniker later was also applied to the domestic market Hyundai Trajet which uses the same platform with the Grandeur XG.

XG250 

The XG250 debuted in 1999 with a 2.5 L Delta V6. It was also marketed as the XG25 in some markets and was produced until 2005. There was a two-liter model called the XG20 for some markets, including South Korea.
 Performance
 Acceleration: 0–60 mph in 10.6 seconds
 Top speed: 
 Power:

XG300 
The XG300 debuted in 1999 with a 3.0 L Sigma V6.

It was manufactured from 2001 to 2003 and marketed as the XG30 in Europe and in Asian countries. A 2.5-liter model, called XG25, was also marketed in some countries, including as France.

In the United States, the XG300 equipped with the 3.0-liter V6 engine was available for the 2001 model year only. The "L" model included heated front seats, rear seat reading lamps, two-position driver's side memory seat and outside mirrors, power moonroof, 6-speaker Infinity AM/FM/CD/cassette stereo system, wood-tone accented steering wheel, electrochromic rearview mirror with a built-in three-channel HomeLink-compatible garage door opener, and a parking aid feature that automatically tilted the dual exterior mirrors downward when the transmission is in reverse. Automatic electronic climate control was available option, along with a power moonroof on the base model, and a trunk-mounted eight-disc CD changer for the L model.
 Performance
 Acceleration: 0–60 mph in 9.8 seconds
 Top speed: 
 Power:

XG350 

The 2002 XG350 models were equipped with a larger 3.5-liter V6 Sigma  engine. In the United States, the power moonroof was no longer an option on base models. 2003 brought a new instrument cluster, and updated graphics for the console trip computer.

In the 2004 model year, the XG350 received larger front brakes (discs went from 10.9- to 12-inch), which in turn required a 16-inch spare tire as standard equipment, replacing the 'space-saver' design used since 2001. Also new this year were restyled front and rear bumpers, bodyside moldings, headlights (now with HID availability), driving lights, tail lamps, grille, and deck lid with recessed license plate holder. The high-mounted stop lamp in the rear window went to an all-new LED design. The interior wood-tone trim changed to a lighter shade, glove compartment and storage bins were now covered in charcoal gray material (formerly black), the door-mounted power window switch panels now matched the interior color (previously, they were high-gloss wood-tone), recessed seat tethers allowed for secure installation of child seats in all three rear seat positions, and the trunk hinges were now supported using hydraulic pistons. Standard equipment leather upholstery was available in solid deep charcoal or a two-tone finish featuring a tan interior with brown dashboard/center console and upper door trim. The L versions were equipped with specific 12-spoke silver-painted allow rims featuring center caps covering the lug nuts. Minor equipment changes inside included redesigned levers for the hood release and tilt steering column, an updated cruise control switch, a recessed trunk pull-down handle, and leather trim around the console armrest tray.

2005 was the last model year for the XG350, as it would be replaced at the top of the Hyundai line-up by the 2006 Azera. Both the base and L models now offered the formerly optional carpeted floor mats as standard equipment, while the L model was now equipped with a standard trunk-mounted eight-disc CD changer. The driver's door switch panel featured a restyled power door lock button; it was now designed to feel less like the adjacent power window controls, for ease of differentiation by touch.

2.0 and 2.5 Delta engines were available in South Korea.

Fourth generation (TG; 2005) 

The Grandeur TG is a mid-size sedan introduced for the 2006 model year. A redesigned XG350, it shares a platform with the Sonata. It is sold as the Hyundai Azera in North America, China, France, Taiwan, Philippines, Iran, Malaysia, The GCC (Persian Gulf states), South Africa, Singapore, Peru, Chile and Brazil. In Europe (except in France), Australia, New Zealand and Japan it was sold as the Grandeur. In Belgium, it was launched as the Grandeur, and renamed Azera in 2006.

The Grandeur/Azera had been the most expensive Hyundai model outside of Korea, China, and the Middle East—until the 2008 introduction of the Genesis.

The Azera has a four-wheel independent suspension (multi-link in the rear) and uses the company's new 3.8 L Lambda V6, which produces . The power is sent to the front wheels through a five or six-speed automatic transmission with a "Shiftronic" manual gear selection.

The 2.2 VGT CRDI diesel engine from the Santa Fe is also available, with the addition of the 2.4 Theta and 2.7 Mu petrol engines in South Korea.

The Limited trim level adds 17-inch alloy wheels, heated front seats, leather seat-upholstery, and a power sun shade in the rear window. The Ultimate Package includes an enhanced audio system with 10 Infinity speakers and a 6-disc CD changer, a power sunroof, powered tilt-telescopic steering wheel, and rain-sensing windshield wipers.

The 2007 model featured a revised gauge pattern and steering wheel controls.

The 2008 model introduced the optional LG Navigation system. It was the first automobile to provide a dual display monitor. The SE models are removed in favor of a GLS model that shares the same 17-inch wheels as the Limited models, and the Aubergine color is no longer available. A wood-trimmed steering wheel is now only available with the Ultimate Package.

The 2009 model featured revised grille, 17-inch 10-spoke alloy wheels, blue back lit gauges and dashboard lighting (vs. the previous green), dark brown wood grain accents and available hands free Bluetooth phone capability. The audio player display takes the same design as the 2009 Hyundai Sonata, and the controls for the audio player have been redesigned. An auxiliary input jack and iPod integration system became standard, though these were deleted with the navigation system on the Limited trim level. The Limited trim level received a wood-trimmed steering wheel and "hyper-silver" alloy wheels.

The Korean Grandeur offers features not available in North American version, including as Proximity Key with Push Button Start and Bluetooth hands-free capability. A refreshed 2010 model was released on 16 December 2009 that incorporated new 7 split-spoke alloy wheels, LED taillights, rectangular exhaust pipe designs, new side mirrors, redesigned headlights, and new front fascia and grille. New interior amenities include Alcantara leather seats and rear passenger audio and climate controls.

For the 2010 model year the Hyundai Azera was dropped in Canada due to slow sales.

For model year 2011, Hyundai restyled the Azera with new front and rear fascias, new alloy wheels, and new fog lamps. The engines were updated with dual variable valve timing and the transmission received one more forward speed for a total of six. The 3.3L V6 was now rated at 260 hp, while the 3.8L V6 now made 283 hp. The fuel economy was also improved with 20/28 for 3.3 and 19/27 for 3.8 (EPA rating pending).

In November 2010, Hyundai sued Avera Motors, a start-up automaker based in Rockledge, Florida, over the use of the name "Avera," claiming it was too close to the Azera name. As a result, Avera changed its name in March 2011 to Rivian Automotive.

Safety 
The Azera comes standard with front airbags for driver and passenger, front and rear head curtain airbags and front and rear seat-mounted torso airbags.

According to the Insurance Institute for Highway Safety the Azera received a Good overall score in the frontal crash test and an Acceptable overall score in the side impact test. The driver's pelvis/leg in the side impact category was given a Poor score and the structure/safety category rated Marginal.

NHTSA Azera

Frontal Driver: 

Frontal Passenger: 

Side Driver: 

Side Rear Passenger (earlier models): 

Side Rear Passenger (later models): 

Rollover:

Awards 
 2006 Canadian Car of the Year awards: named "Best New Family Car (over CAN$35,000)"
 Strategic Vision, 2007, named the "Winner Strategic Vision's 2007 Total Quality Index (TQI) for the large car segment"
 Kiplinger's Personal Finance "Best in Class" in the $25,000 to $30,000 category, 2007 Azera:
 Kiplinger's Personal Finance 2007 Car Buyer's "Best of 2007 Cars" March 2007.
 Edmunds.com Editors Most Wanted – 2007
 Edmunds.com Editor's Most Wanted Sedan Under $30,000
 Consumer's Digest, 2007, named "A Consumer's Digest Best Buy"
 J.D. Power and Associates – 2006: named "Most Appealing Large Car"
 IIHS, 2006, earned an overall "good" rating in the crash test, frontal offset impacts.
 AutoPacific, 2006, named "Best in Class Vehicle Satisfaction, Large Luxury Car
 Strategic Vision, 2006, named the "Winner Strategic Vision's 2006 Total Value Award for Best Large Car Ownership Experience"

Fifth generation (HG; 2011) 

The fifth generation Grandeur/Azera was unveiled at the 2011 Los Angeles International Auto Show as a 2012 model. It was developed over a period of three and half years with a cost of 450 million dollars. The Grandeur nameplate remained in use in South Korea, but most export markets received it as the "Hyundai Azera."

In terms of dimensions, the Azera slots between the midsize Sonata and the rear-wheel drive Genesis. The Azera's competitors include cars such as the Ford Taurus, Dodge Charger, Chevrolet Impala, and entry-level luxury (or near-luxury) cars such as the Buick LaCrosse, Nissan Maxima, Toyota Avalon, Chrysler 300.

Initial release 
The Grandeur HG was released by Hyundai with an all new appearance and an engine The Grandeur HG followed the "fluidic sculpture" design of modern Hyundai vehicles. This design is dubbed as the "Grand Glide" concept.

The four-cylinder has a fuel economy of  (7.8 L/100 km) and the V6 is rated at  (8.5 L/100 km). The Premium model features adaptive cruise control and a semi-automatic parking assist system.

Early Korean models of Grandeur include Theta II 2.4 GDI, Lambda II 3.0 GDI. Korean version equipment includes auto high beam, lane departure warning, blind spot detection, and electric park brake.

Powertrain 

All models come standard with a 6-speed automatic transmission and is the only transmission available.

Hyundai Grandeur Hybrid (2013–2017) 
It is a version of Hyundai Grandeur for South Korea market, with 2.4-liter Theta II MPi (159PS) engine, 47PS electric motor, projector beam headlights, LED tail lights, a dual exhaust system, 17-inch aluminum wheels, Nappa leather seats, a leather-wrapped steering wheel and wood grain trim, dual-zone automatic climate control, heated seats, a rear view camera, a USB charging system, an infotainment system with a 6-inch display. Options include a panoramic sunroof, a premium audio system and GPS navigation.

The vehicle went on sale on December 17, 2013.

2014 model year update 
Changes to US models of Hyundai Azera include lower starting price of $31,000 ($1,250 reduction from 2013), refined steering feel and precision, standard 6-inch color LCD audio display with rear view camera, standard driver blind-spot mirror, new electroluminescent gauge cluster with color LCD trip computer, new 8-inch navigation system standard on Limited, power-folding side mirrors standard on Limited, Hyundai Assurance Connected Care telematics services standard for three years.

Sixth generation (IG; 2016) 

Hyundai unveiled the sixth generation Grandeur on October 27, 2016. The sixth generation model was not sold in North America due to slow sales of the preceding version; other than Hyundai's new luxury division Genesis Motors, the Sonata became the largest and most expensive sedan marketed by Hyundai in the US. A Hybrid model was added in March 2017. The 2.2-liter diesel engine option was discontinued in 2018. 132,000 Grandeurs were sold in 2017 and about 110,000 vehicles were sold in 2018. It is the best-selling vehicle in its category in the South Korean market.

Facelift 
A facelifted Grandeur was launched in November 2019. Exterior changes include a bigger grill with turn signals and daytime running lights (DRL) integrated into the grill's diamond patterns plus new headlights and taillights. Interior changes include a new optional 12.3-inch widescreen infotainment system, new shift-by-wire (SBW) buttons replacing the old gear lever, and a new touchscreen for climate controls. Other changes include a new remote parking system and an improved autonomous emergency braking system.

For the powertrain, a new Smartstream G2.5 GDi with an 8-speed automatic transmission replaced the 2.4L Theta II GDi engine with the 6-speed automatic transmission and both 3.0L Lambda II MPi/GDi engine options are discontinued.

The Sonata, which had been selling the most as a People's car for a long time in the Korean market, saw a sharp decline in sales, but the Grandeur sold 90,000 to 100,000 vehicles a month, ranking first in sales.

Engines and transmissions

Seventh generation (GN7; 2022) 
The seventh-generation was released in South Korea on November 14, 2022, six years after the sixth-generation Grandeur.

The exterior features DRL and positioning lamps that are seamlessly connected in a full-width horizontal layout with integrated turn signal functions, and cowl points that have moved to the rear. The interior has a wrap-around structure, featuring softly spreading ambient mood lamps and a pattern on the door trim designed with a Korean feel.

The seventh-generation Grandeur is equipped with the infotainment system ccNC, two built-in cameras, two digital keys, interior fingerprint authentication system, reclining (rear seat), and electric door curtains. The hybrid model is equipped with an E-motion drive that uses a drive motor to improve driving performance.

Powertrain

Sales 
Since its introduction to the U.S. market in late 2000, the XG/Azera had been a consistent seller until late 2008, when it suffered a significant drop in sales. Although there are several possible explanations for this decline, the Hyundai Genesis sedan was introduced to the U.S. market in late 2008, suggesting that the more sophisticated rear-wheel drive Genesis may have cannibalized sales of the Azera. The Hyundai Genesis sedan is considered by auto journalists to be a rival to the aforementioned full-size and near-luxury vehicles that the 2012 Azera is positioned against, such as the Ford Taurus, Toyota Avalon, and Buick LaCrosse.

References

External links 

Grandeur
Cars introduced in 1986
1990s cars
2000s cars
2010s cars
2020s cars
Executive cars
Sedans
Flagship vehicles
Front-wheel-drive vehicles
All-wheel-drive vehicles
Hybrid electric cars
Partial zero-emissions vehicles